Albert Edward Chilcott (19 February 1924 – 1 April 2003) was a Canadian rower. He competed in the men's eight event at the 1952 Summer Olympics.

References

1924 births
2003 deaths
Canadian male rowers
Olympic rowers of Canada
Rowers at the 1952 Summer Olympics
Place of birth missing